Jade Starbiz was a Hong Kong entertainment talk/news program on Television Broadcasts Limited that was replaced by "E-Buzz", a similar program, as of October 2005. It featured various celebrity news, gossip, and interviews, current popular music and culture in Hong Kong, and new and upcoming shows on TVB. Jade Starbiz played on TVB Jade and on many international TVB channels.

TVB original programming